Space Station Zulu is a turn-based strategy game written for the Atari 8-bit family by Dennis Shields and  published by Avalon Hill in 1982. An Apple II port programmed by Dennis Milbert was released the same year. The player manages the defense of a space station which has been infiltrated by alien life forms.

Gameplay
Space Station Zulu is a game in which the player is the Captain of the Space Station Zulu, with a crew of peace loving alien Yargs.

Reception
Hosea Battles, Jr reviewed the game for Computer Gaming World, and stated that "the game is an excellent strategy situation. You won't win the first time, but keep trying."

See also
The Awful Green Things from Outer Space

References

External links
Review in Softalk
Review in Commander

1982 video games
Avalon Hill video games
Apple II games
Atari 8-bit family games
FM-7 games
NEC PC-8801 games
Survival video games
Turn-based strategy video games
Video games about extraterrestrial life
Video games developed in the United States
Video games set in outer space